Free is the title of Kate Ryan's fourth studio album. It was released on May 30, 2008 by ARS/Universal.  It includes the singles, "Voyage Voyage", "L.I.L.Y.", "Ella elle l'a", "I Surrender" and "Your Eyes". The album performed moderately well on the charts and was certified Gold in Poland for shipments of 18,000 copies.

Track listing 
All songs produced by Niclas Kings and Niklas Bergwall, collectively known as 2N.

Original release

Second edition

UK edition only
 "The Rain"
"Je T'Adore"
"Libertine"
"Désenchantée"
"I Surrender" (Chuckle Brothers remix) [iTunes Exclusive]
"Ella Ella L'a (English Extended Version)" [iTunes Exclusive]

Spanish edition
"Ella elle l'a" - 3:18
"Tonight We Ride / No Digas Que No - 3:05
"Voyage Voyage" - 3:09
I Surrender" - 3:33
"Who Do You Love" - 3:44
"Your Eyes" - 3:46
"L.I.L.Y." - 3:18
"Take Me Down" - 4:32
"Put My Finger on It" - 3:33
"Sweet Mistake" - 3:58
"Toute Première Fois" - 4:08
"We All Belong" - 3:31
"Free" - 3:31

Polish Special Edition w/ DVD
All Original edition tracks Plus Music Videos
"Voyage Voyage" (Music Video)
"L.I.L.Y." (Music Video)
"Ella Elle L'a" (Music Video)
"I Surrender" (Music Video)
"Photo Gallery"

Personnel
Kate Ryan - Vocals, lyricist
Niclas Kings - Producer, lyricist
Niklas Bergwall - Producer, lyricist
Jeanette Olsson - Backing vocals, vocal arrangement, lyricist
Anna Nordell - Backing vocals
Aggie G. - Backing vocals
Lisa Greene - Lyricist
Jim Dyke - Lyricist
Ashley Cadelle - Lyricist
Ian Curnow - Lyricist
Georgie Dennis - Lyricist
Darren Styles - Lyricist
Jo Lemaire - French translations
Mattias Bylund - Strings
Johan Rude - Mixing

Charts

References

External links 
 

2008 albums
Kate Ryan albums